Darius Arjen Joel van Driel (born 2 June 1989) is a Dutch professional golfer who plays on the European Tour.

Amateur career
Born in Leidschendam, Netherlands, van Driel took up golf at the age of 11. His junior and amateur career, up to and including 2014, saw him win the Dutch National Strokeplay Championship under-19 (2007) and under-22 (2010).

He also won the 2008 Dutch National Strokeplay Championship, which earned him entry to that year's KLM Dutch Open where he missed the cut (+11) but finished as second Dutch amateur player.

He was selected as a member of the Dutch team for the European Amateur Team Championship in 2007 and 2010. Also during this period he took some time away from the game to complete a bachelor's degree in Economics and Sports Marketing at the Johan Cruyff Institute in Amsterdam.

In 2013 he won the Dutch National Matchplay Championship. and in 2014, his last year as an amateur, he finished second at the Lytham Trophy and was again selected as a member of the Dutch team for the European Amateur Team Championship. He ended his amateur career by taking second place in the qualifying school for the 2015 season of the Alps Tour, one of the European third-tier professional tours.

Professional career

2015–2019
In 2015, his first year as a professional golfer, van Driel competed in the Alps Tour. With one victory, and five 2nd places he won the overall Alps Tour Order of Merit. and gained automatic entry to the 2016 Challenge Tour.

In 2016, van Driel finished 34th in the 2016 Challenge Tour Order of Merit  ensuring his place in the 2017 Challenge Tour. He also represented the Netherlands, partnering Joost Luiten in the 2016 World Cup of Golf where they finished T17.

In 2017, in a year hampered by a minor back problem, van Driel could only finish 91st in the final Challenge Tour rankings.

In 2018, van Driel claimed the first Challenge Tour win by a Dutch golfer in 5 years, in the Euram Bank Open in Austria in July. and ended in 34th position in the year-end Challenge Tour rankings.

2019 was van Driel's fourth season on the Challenge Tour. He won the Rolex Trophy and with six other top-10 finishes he ended 13th in the 2019 Order of Merit, earning direct promotion to the 2020 European Tour in Category 14. He also played in four main tour events, with a best result of 2nd place in the Belgian Knockout. In December he was voted Dutch Golfer of the year.

2020
In a European Tour season seriously disrupted by the COVID-19 pandemic, van Driel finished 157th in the Race to Dubai year end rankings.

2021
With the rankings from 2019 carried forward for an extra year because of the COVID-19 pandemic, van Driel played his 2nd European Tour season in Category 14. With one 2nd place finish, in the Porsche European Open, 4th place in the Dutch Open and three other top-10 finishes, van Driel ended 97th in the Race to Dubai 2021 year end rankings., earning a full Tour card in Category 10 for 2022.

Amateur wins
2007 Dutch National Under 18 Strokeplay Championship
2008 Dutch National Open Strokeplay Championship
2010 Dutch National Under 21 Strokeplay Championship
2013 Dutch National Matchplay Championship, Dutch National Foursomes Championship (with Bernard Geelkerken)

Source:

Professional wins (6)

Challenge Tour wins (2)

Alps Tour wins (1)

Other wins (3)
2015 Dutch National Strokeplay Championship
2016 Duinzicht Invitational
2018 Duinzicht Invitational

Team appearances
Amateur
European Boys' Team Championship (representing the Netherlands): 2007
European Amateur Team Championship (representing the Netherlands): 2007, 2010, 2014
St Andrews Trophy (representing the Continent of Europe): 2014

Professional
World Cup (representing the Netherlands): 2016

See also
2019 Challenge Tour graduates

References

External links

Dutch male golfers
European Tour golfers
People from Leidschendam
Sportspeople from The Hague
1989 births
Living people
21st-century Dutch people